City Gate Towers are two class A office buildings located in Bucharest, Romania. The two 18-story buildings stand at a height of 72 meters, and have a total surface of 47,700 m2 (22,350 m2 each). The buildings are also equipped with 1,000 parking spaces.

References

External links

References 

Skyscraper office buildings in Bucharest
Twin towers
Office buildings completed in 2009